The following railroads operate in the U.S. state of Missouri.

Common freight carriers
Arkansas and Missouri Railroad (AM)
Affton Terminal Services Railroad (AT)
Belton, Grandview and Kansas City Railroad (BGKX)
BNSF Railway (BNSF)
Burlington Junction Railway (BJRY)
Canadian Pacific Railway (CP) through subsidiary Dakota, Minnesota and Eastern Railroad (DME)
Central Midland Railway (CMR) operates Missouri Central Railroad (MOC)
Columbia Terminal Railroad (CT)
FTRL Railway (FTRL)
Kansas City Southern Railway (KCS)
Kansas City Terminal Railway (KCT)
Kaw River Railroad (KAW)
Missouri North Central Railroad (MNC)
Missouri and Northern Arkansas Railroad (MNA)
Norfolk Southern Railway (NS)
Ozark Valley Railroad (OVRR)
Pemiscot County Port Railroad (PCPA)
SEMO Port Railroad (SE)
South Kansas and Oklahoma Railroad (SKOL)
Terminal Railroad Association of St. Louis (TRRA)
Union Pacific Railroad (UP) including subsidiary Southern Illinois and Missouri Bridge Company
West Belt Railroad (WBRW)

Private freight carriers
TransitAmerica Services

Passenger carriers

Amtrak (AMTK)
Belton, Grandview and Kansas City Railroad
Branson Scenic Railway
St. Louis, Iron Mountain and Southern Railway

Defunct railroads

Electric railways and predecessors
Cape Girardeau – Jackson Interurban Railway
East St. Louis and Suburban Railway
Illinois Terminal Company
Illinois Terminal Railroad (ITC)
Interurban South Side Railway
Kansas City, Clay County and St. Joseph Railway
Kansas City Interurban Railway
Kansas City, Kaw Valley Railroad
Kansas City, Kaw Valley and Western Railway (KV&W, KVW)
Kansas City Public Service Company
Kansas City and Westport Belt Railway (KCWB)
Missouri and Kansas Interurban Railway
St. Francois County Electric Railroad
St. Francois County Railroad
St. Francois County Railway
St. Joseph and Savannah Interurban Railway
St. Louis and Florissant Railroad
St. Louis and Suburban Railway
Southwest Missouri Railroad Company
Union Railway (Missouri)  (St. Louis)
Union Railroad (Missouri) (St. Joseph)
West End Narrow Gauge Railroad

Heritage railways
Kansas City Railroad Museum

Notes

References
Association of American Railroads (2003), . Retrieved May 11, 2005.

External links
Railroads in Missouri, a gallery of historic photos from the Missouri State Archives

Missouri
 
 
Railroads